Thomas Gleeson may refer to:
 Thomas Gleeson (Australian politician) (Thomas Patrick Gleeson), member of the New South Wales Legislative Council
 Thomas Gleeson (American politician), member of the Wisconsin State Assembly
 Tom Gleeson, Australian stand-up comedian, writer, television and radio presenter
 Tom Gleeson (rugby union), Irish rugby union player
 Tom Gleeson (rugby league) (Thomas Patrick Gleeson), Australian rugby league player